Shaina Pellington (born June 1, 1999) is a Canadian basketball player.

She played for the Canada Women's National Basketball team. She competed at the 2020 Summer Olympics.

She participated at the 2021 FIBA Women's AmeriCup.

College 
She began her US college basketball career at the University of Oklahoma in 2017, playing there two seasons until transferring to the University of Arizona. After sitting out the 2019–20 season due to NCAA transfer rules, she became a key substitute for a Wildcats team that went on to narrowly lose in the national championship game to conference rival Stanford.

Personal life 
She is openly lesbian.

References

External links
 Arizona Wildcats bio

1996 births
Living people
Arizona Wildcats women's basketball players
Basketball players at the 2019 Pan American Games
Basketball players at the 2020 Summer Olympics
Basketball players from Toronto
Canadian women's basketball players
LGBT basketball players
Canadian LGBT sportspeople
Oklahoma Sooners women's basketball players
Olympic basketball players of Canada